Lea Davison (born May 19, 1983) is an American cross-country mountain biker from Jericho, Vermont.  At the 2012 Summer Olympics, she competed in the Women's cross-country at Hadleigh Farm, finishing in 11th place, and she finished 7th in the same event at the 2016 Summer Olympics in Rio de Janeiro.

References

American mountain bikers
American female cyclists
Living people
Olympic cyclists of the United States
Cyclists at the 2012 Summer Olympics
Cyclists at the 2016 Summer Olympics
1983 births
Cyclists from Vermont
Middlebury College alumni
21st-century American women